Joseph Schildkraut (22 March 1896 – 21 January 1964) was an Austrian-American actor. He won an Oscar for his performance as Captain Alfred Dreyfus in the film The Life of Emile Zola (1937); later, he was nominated for a Golden Globe for his performance as Otto Frank in the film The Diary of Anne Frank (1959) and a Primetime Emmy for his performance as Rabbi Gottlieb in a 1962 episode of the television series Sam Benedict.

Early life 
Schildkraut was born in Vienna, Austria, the son of Erna (née Weinstein) and stage (and later motion picture) actor Rudolph Schildkraut. His family was Jewish. 

In 1910, he accompanied his father on his tour to the U.S. and returned to Europe in 1913. He began stage training with Max Reinhardt in Berlin shortly afterward, began his career on the stages of Germany and Austria, then made the transition to film. Schildkraut moved to the U.S. in 1920 and appeared in many Broadway productions. Among the plays in which he starred was a notable production of Peer Gynt.

Career

 
In 1921, Schildkraut played the title role in the first American stage production of Ferenc Molnár's Liliom, the play that eventually became the basis for Rodgers and Hammerstein's Carousel. He then began working in silent movies, but he returned to the stage occasionally. He had early success in film as the Chevalier de Vaudrey in D.W. Griffith's Orphans of the Storm with Lillian Gish. Later, he was featured in Cecil B. DeMille's epic 1927 film The King of Kings as Judas Iscariot. Schildraut's father Rudolf also appeared in the film. Joseph Schildkraut also played a Viennese-accented, non-singing Gaylord Ravenal in the 1929 part-talkie film version of Edna Ferber's Show Boat. The character as written in the 1929 film was much closer to Ferber's original than to the depiction of him in the classic Kern and Hammerstein musical play based on the novel as well as the 1936 and 1951 film versions of the musical, but the 1929 film was not a critical or box-office success.

Schildkraut received an Academy Award for Best Supporting Actor for his role as Alfred Dreyfus in The Life of Emile Zola (1937). Additional accolades came for playing the ambitious duc d'Orléans in the historical epic Marie Antoinette (1938), and he gave a notable performance as the villainous Nicolas Fouquet in The Man in the Iron Mask (1939).

Schildkraut is perhaps best remembered today for playing the role of Otto Frank in both the original stage production and film version of The Diary of Anne Frank (1959). He was also an active character actor and appeared in guest roles on several early television shows, including the Hallmark Hall of Fame, in which he played Claudius in the 1953 television production of Hamlet, with Maurice Evans in the title role. Schildkraut also hosted and starred in Joseph Schildkraut Presents, a short-lived series on the DuMont Television Network from October 1953 to January 1954.

In 1961, during the third season of The Twilight Zone, he made his first appearance on "Deaths-Head Revisited". He later played an elderly man in "The Trade-Ins" in season 3, episode 31 of the same show. In 1963, he was nominated for a Best Actor Emmy Award for his performance in a guest-starring role on Sam Benedict.

Personal life
Schildkraut was married three times. His first marriage was to actress Elise Bartlett in 1923; they divorced in 1931. He married Mary McKay in 1932 until her death on February 17, 1962. In 1963, Schildkraut married Leonora Rogers, who survived him. Schildkraut died at his home in New York City of a heart attack. His father had died at the same age, also of a heart attack.

For his contributions to the motion picture industry, Schildkraut has a star on the Hollywood Walk of Fame at 6780 Hollywood Boulevard. He is interred in the Hollywood Forever Cemetery.

Filmography

 Dämon und Mensch (1915)
 Das Wiegenlied (1916)
 Für den Ruhm des Geliebten (1916) as Musiker Rolf
 Seine Durchlaucht der Landstreicher (1919)
 Die schwarze Fahne (1919)
 Der Roman der Komtesse Ruth (1920)
 Theodor Herzl (1921) as Das leidende Israel
 Orphans of the Storm (1921) as Chevalier de Vaudrey
 The Song of Love (1923) as Raymon Valverde
 The Road to Yesterday (1925) as Kenneth Paulton
 Shipwrecked (1926) as Larry O'Neil
 Meet the Prince (1926) as Prince Nicholas
 Young April (1926) as Prince Caryl
 The King of Kings (1927) as Judas Iscariot
 The Heart Thief (1927) as Paul Kurt
 His Dog (1927) as Peter Olsen
 The Forbidden Woman (1927) as Jean La Coste
 The Blue Danube (1928) as Ludwig
 Tenth Avenue (1928) as Joe Ross
 Show Boat (1929) as Gaylord Ravenal
 The Mississippi Gambler (1929) as Jack Morgan
 Night Ride (1930) as Joe Rooker
 Cock o' the Walk (1930) as Carlos Lopez
 Carnival (1931) as Count Andreas Scipio
 The Blue Danube (1932) as Sandor
 Viva Villa! (1934) as Gen. Pascal
 Sisters Under the Skin (1934) as Zukowski
 Cleopatra (1934) as Herod
 The Crusades (1935) as Conrad - Marquis of Montferrat
 The Garden of Allah (1936) as Batouch
 Slave Ship (1937) as Danelo
 Souls at Sea (1937) as Gaston de Bastonet
 The Life of Emile Zola (1937) as Capt. Alfred Dreyfus
 Lancer Spy (1937) as Prince Ferdi Zu Schwarzwald
 Lady Behave! (1937) as Michael Andrews
 The Baroness and the Butler (1938) as Baron Georg Marissey
 Marie Antoinette (1938) as duc d’Orleans
 Suez (1938) as Vicomte Rene De Latour
 Idiot's Delight (1939) as Captain Kirvline
 The Three Musketeers (1939) as King Louis XIII
 The Man in the Iron Mask (1939) as Fouquet
 Mr. Moto Takes a Vacation (1939) as Hendrik Manderson
 Lady of the Tropics (1939) as Pierre Delaroch
 The Rains Came (1939) as Mr. Bannerjee
 Pack Up Your Troubles (1939) as Hugo Ludwig
 Phantom Raiders (1940) as Al Taurez
 Rangers of Fortune (1940) as Col. Lewis Rebstock
 The Shop Around the Corner (1940) as Ferencz Vadas
 Meet the Wildcat (1940) as Leon Dumeray
 The Parson of Panamint (1941) as Bob Deming
 The Tell-Tale Heart (1941, short) as Young Man
 Flame of Barbary Coast (1945) as Tito Morell
 The Cheaters (1945) as Anthony 'Mr. M.' Marchand
 Monsieur Beaucaire (1946) as Don Francisco
 Plainsman and the Lady (1946) as Peter Marquette
 Northwest Outpost (1947) as Count Igor Savin
 Old Los Angeles (1948) as Luis Savarin
 The Gallant Legion (1948) as Sen. Clarke Faulkner
 Hamlet (1953, TV) as King Claudius 
 The Diary of Anne Frank (1959) as Otto Frank
 The Big Bankroll (1961) as Abraham Rothstein
  [[Dr. Kildare (1961 TV series) Episode: The Stepping Stone as Max Keller
 The Twilight Zone, Episode: Deaths-Head Revisited (1961, TV) as Alfred Becker
 The Twilight Zone, Episode: The Trade-Ins (1962, TV) as John Holt
 The Greatest Story Ever Told (1965) as Nicodemus

See also

 List of German-speaking Academy Award winners and nominees
 List of actors with Academy Award nominations

References

Further reading
 Joseph Schildkraut, My Father and I'', as told to Leo Lania, New York 1959.

External links

 
 
 Photographs and literature
 

1896 births
1964 deaths
Austrian expatriate male actors in the United States
Austrian male film actors
Austrian male silent film actors
Austrian male stage actors
Austrian male television actors
Austrian people of Jewish descent
Best Supporting Actor Academy Award winners
Burials at Hollywood Forever Cemetery
Male actors from Vienna
20th-century Austrian male actors
Jewish Austrian male actors
Austrian emigrants to the United States